Can, also known as Inner Space (also, with additional tracks, as Legendary Can), is the tenth studio album by experimental rock band  Can, released in 1979. Former bassist Holger Czukay's involvement with this album was limited to tape editing. It was Can's last album before the reunion album Rite Time, ten years later, and was released after the band's break-up.

Track listing

Personnel
Can
Michael Karoli – guitar, vocals; bass on "Can Be"
Irmin Schmidt – keyboards
Holger Czukay – editing
Rosko Gee – bass
Jaki Liebezeit – drums
Rebop Kwaku Baah – percussion

References

External links
"Can-Inner-Space" at discogs.com

1979 albums
Can (band) albums
Mute Records albums